Transported by Design was a programme of activities which aimed to raise awareness of the importance of both physical and service design in London's transport network. The 18-month long campaign showcased how design has helped shape London's transport system as known today.

In October 2015, after two months of public voting, 10 favourite transport design icons were chosen by Londoners. The winners, selected from among 100 options, were:
Black cab
work of Frank Pick
Harry Beck's original tube map
Baker Street tube station platforms
London Underground roundel
AEC Routemaster bus
Mark Wallinger's Labyrinth
RT type bus
S-Stock trains
Westminster tube station

The programme showcased transport design through exhibitions, walks, the launch of a new uniform for London Underground in November 2015 and an event at Regent Street in July 2016 The programme was sponsored by Exterion Media.

References

2016 in London
Transport in London